Bruce Wayne LaSane (born March 24, 1967) is a former American football wide receiver who played eight seasons in the Arena Football League with the Cincinnati Rockers, Miami Hooters, Minnesota Fighting Pike, Milwaukee Mustangs, Orlando Predators, New Jersey Red Dogs, and Los Angeles Avengers. He played college football at Florida State University and attended Wildwood High School in Wildwood, Florida. He was also a member of the Tampa Bay Buccaneers and Orlando Thunder.

Early years
LaSane played high school football for the Wildwood High School Wildcats. The Wildcats advanced to the Class AA state championship game in 1984 and 1985. His senior season, he was a member of the Super 24 team, was a USA Today honorable mention All-American, was named a Bally All-American and represented Wildwood in the Florida-Georgia all-star game.

College career
LaSane was a member of the Florida State Seminoles from 1986 to 1989. He recorded 46 receptions for 731 and six touchdowns in his college career. He was an Honorable Mention All-American selection by The Sporting News in 1988.

Professional career

Tampa Bay Buccaneers
LaSane signed with the Tampa Bay Buccaneers in July 1990 after going undrafted in the 1990 NFL Draft.

Orlando Thunder
LaSane selected in the seventh round of the WLAF's wide receivers draft by the Orlando Thunder in 1991.

Cincinnati Rockers
LaSane played for the Cincinnati Rockers from 1992 to 1993.

Miami Hooters
LaSane played for the Miami Hooters from 1994 to 1995, earning First Team All-Arena honors in 1994.

Minnesota Fighting Pike
LaSane spent time with the Minnesota Fighting Pike in 1996.

Milwaukee Mustangs
LaSane also spent time with the Milwaukee Mustangs during the 1996 season.

Orlando Predators
LaSane played for the Orlando Predators from 1997 to 1998.

New Jersey Red Dogs
LaSane signed with the New Jersey Red Dogs on April 21, 2000.

Los Angeles Avengers
LaSane was traded to the Los Angeles Avengers on June 6, 2000.

References

External links
Just Sports Stats
College stats

Living people
1967 births
Players of American football from Florida
American football wide receivers
African-American players of American football
Florida State Seminoles football players
Orlando Thunder players
Cincinnati Rockers players
Miami Hooters players
Minnesota Fighting Pike players
Milwaukee Mustangs (1994–2001) players
Orlando Predators players
New Jersey Red Dogs players
Los Angeles Avengers players
People from Wildwood, Florida
21st-century African-American people
20th-century African-American sportspeople